Emin Eldar oglu Amrullayev  (born 30 December 1982), is serving as the minister of education of the Republic of Azerbaijan since July 2020. He served as director of the Institute of Education of the Republic of Azerbaijan from January 2020 to July 2020 and as Head of the Education Programs Development Department at the Ministry of Education of Azerbaijan from March 2015 to January 2020.

Biography 
Amrullayev has served as the Minister of science and education of the Republic of Azerbaijan since 2022. He served as the Minister of Education of the Republic of Azerbaijan from 2020 to 2022, Director of the Institute of Education of the Republic of Azerbaijan from January to July 2020 and Head of the department of Educational Development Programs at the Ministry of Education of the Republic of Azerbaijan from March 2015 to January 2020.

1999–2003 – Studied at the Academy of Public Administration under the President of the Republic of Azerbaijan, graduated from the faculty of Public Administration and obtained Bachelor's degree with honors.
2003–2004 – Studied at the Central European University, graduated from the faculty of Political Sciences and obtained Master's degree.
2010–2012 – Within the "State Program for the Education of Azerbaijani Youth Abroad in 2007-2015" and the "Fulbright" programs he obtained Master's degree in Public (Administrative) Management at Columbia University.

Career 
 2005–2009 – Lecturer at the International Relations Department, Qafqaz University, Baku, Azerbaijan					
 2009–2010 – Head of International Relations Department, Kaspi Education Center, Baku, Azerbaijan
 2011 – Intern at UN Economic Commission for Europe (UNECE), Geneva, Switzerland
 2012 – Executive Director of the Center for Energy and Environment at the Azerbaijan Diplomatic Academy (now ADA University)
 2013 – Deputy Director for Quality Assurance in Education at "Kaspi Education" LLC
 June 2013 – Senior advisor at the Ministry of Education of the Republic of Azerbaijan, in 2013–2014 – Head of division, in 2014–2015 - Deputy Head of department, in 2015–2020 - Head of department.
 January to July 2020 – Director of the Institute of Education of the Republic of Azerbaijan
 27 July 2020 – Appointed as Minister of Education of the Republic of Azerbaijan by the order of the President of Azerbaijan Ilham Aliyev

Notes 
 According to the decree of the President of the Republic of Azerbaijan, H.E. Ilham Aliyev, "On some measures to improve the management in the field of science and education in the Republic of Azerbaijan" dated 28 July 2022 the Ministry of Education of the Republic of Azerbaijan was renamed to Ministry of Science and Education of the Republic of Azerbaijan in order to strengthen the science and education interaction and to improve management in these fields.

References

1982 births
Living people
Education ministers of Azerbaijan
Politicians from Baku
Central European University alumni
School of International and Public Affairs, Columbia University alumni